The Middletown Commercial Historic District is national historic district located at Middletown, Henry County, Indiana. It encompasses 17 contributing buildings in the central business district of Middletown.  It developed between about the 1852 and 1916, and includes excellent examples of Italianate, Romanesque Revival, and Classical Revival styles of architecture.   Notable buildings include the Hedrick Block (1891, 1995), Hedrick Block (1880), Tykle Building (1873), Druley Building (1899), Masonic Building (1899), Farmers State Bank (1914), Wisehart Building (1916), and Summers Building (1868).

It was added to the National Register of Historic Places in 2010.

References

Historic districts on the National Register of Historic Places in Indiana
Neoclassical architecture in Indiana
Italianate architecture in Indiana
Romanesque Revival architecture in Indiana
Historic districts in Henry County, Indiana
National Register of Historic Places in Henry County, Indiana